Andrew Dykstra (born January 2, 1986) is a retired American soccer goalkeeper.

Career

College and amateur
Dykstra grew up in Woodbridge, Virginia, attended Osbourn Park High School, and played college soccer at Virginia Commonwealth University from 2004 to 2008, redshirting in his first year. He was named to the CAA All-Rookie Team as a freshman in 2005, and played in all 18 matches for VCU in his senior season, being named to the All-CAA Second Team and recognized as the goalkeeper on the 2008 Scholar All-East Third Team.

During his college years Dykstra also played four seasons in the USL Premier Development League for Richmond Kickers Future.

Professional
Undrafted out of college, Dykstra was signed to Chicago Fire's developmental roster on April 6, 2009 and signed to a senior roster spot later in June 2009. He made his full professional debut for Fire on June 30, 2009, in a US Open Cup third-round game against Wilmington Hammerheads.

Dykstra became the Fire's number one goalkeeper just prior to the 2010 season, when the new coaching staff, in a surprise last-minute move, chose to waive starting goalkeeper Jon Busch. He made his MLS debut on March 27, 2010, in Chicago's 2010 season opener against the New York Red Bulls

On January 31, 2011, the Fire announced that they released Dykstra after two seasons with the club. Dykstra signed with Charleston Battery of the USL Pro league on March 23, 2011.

On August 12, 2011, Dykstra was named Most Valuable Player at the final league game of the regular season, in recognition for his successful season in which he led the USL Pro League in lowest Goals Against Average and fewest goals allowed.

During the 2014 season, Dykstra started for the first time in the MLS since 2010 for three matches to replace injured goalkeeper Bill Hamid. Dykstra performed "admirably" allowing only one goal. Later in the same season, Dykstra started for a friendly game against Fulham FC where he suffered a ruptured Achilles and was ruled out for the rest of the season.

Following his release from D.C. United at the end of the 2016 season, Dykstra was selected by Sporting Kansas City in the 2016 MLS Re-Entry Draft Stage 2.

On February 8, 2018, Dykstra was traded by Sporting Kansas City to Colorado Rapids in exchange for a second-round pick in the 2020 MLS SuperDraft. Dykstra was released by Colorado at the end of their 2018 season.

In March 2019, Dykstra retired from professional soccer.

Personal life 
Dykstra enjoys homebrewing in his personal time. After retiring from professional soccer, Dykstra took a job for Prince William Soccer in Virginia.

References

External links

1986 births
Living people
American soccer players
American people of Dutch descent
VCU Rams men's soccer players
Richmond Kickers Future players
Chicago Fire FC players
Charleston Battery players
D.C. United players
Richmond Kickers players
Sporting Kansas City players
Sporting Kansas City II players
Colorado Rapids players
Charlotte Independence players
Soccer players from Honolulu
USL League Two players
Major League Soccer players
USL Championship players
Association football goalkeepers
Osbourn Park High School alumni